East West 101 was a drama series airing on the SBS network. The series was produced and created by Steven Knapman and Kris Wyld, the team behind other drama series such as Wildside and White Collar Blue. It ran from 2007–2011, having three series.

East West 101 was set around the Major Crime Squad in metropolitan Sydney. It was based upon the experiences of actual detectives in a crime unit in Sydney's western suburbs. It was filmed on location, in Sydney suburbs such as Auburn, Bankstown, Redfern, Chinatown and Maroubra.

The series was made by SBS with the Film Finance Corporation of Australia and the New South Wales Film and Television Office. It has been sold to Israel and other countries in the Middle East. The second season finished airing on 24 November 2009, and a third season was announced and filmed in 2010. It began airing on SBS One on 20 April 2011. The DVD of the third season was released on 4 May 2011.

Cast

Main
 Don Hany as Detective Zane Malik 
 Susie Porter as Detective Superintendent Patricia Wright
 Aaron Fa'aoso as Detective Sonny Koa 
 Daniela Farinacci as Detective Helen Callas
 Renee Lim as Constable Jung Lim
 Matthew Nable as Detective Neil Travis (season 3)

Supporting
 Lucy Abroon as Yasmeen Malik
 Serhat Caradee as Oscar Catas (season 2)
 Richard Carter as Mick Deakin (season 2)
 Richard Cawthorne as Sterling (season 3)
 George Fayed as Amir Malik
 Dimitri Giameos as Ali El Babb (Season 1)
 Gyton Grantley as Craig Deakin (season 2)
 Taffy Hany as Rahman Malik
 Gerald Lepkowski as Agent Richard Skeritt (season 2)
 William McInnes as Detective Sergeant Ray Crowley (season 1)
 Irini Pappas as Mariam Malik (season 1)
 Tasneem Roc as Amina Malik
 Costa Ronin as Gregorovich (season 2)

Plot

Season one
The first season centered around two detectives, Zane Malik (Don Hany), a Muslim and Ray Crowley (William McInnes), an Anglo-Australian, who are pitted against each other in a struggle for respect. They try to balance work with their own cultural and religious beliefs, which results in tension between cultures, egos and workmates. Recurring stories throughout the season include Malik's search for the man who shot his father and Crowley's struggle with his son's death. The cast also included Susie Porter as Inspector Patricia Wright, Aaron Fa'aoso as Detective Sonny Koa, Daniela Farinacci as Detective Helen Callas and Renee Lim as Jung Lim. Zane's father, Rahman Malik, is played by Taffy (Toffeek) Hany, the real life father of Don Hany.

Season two
In season two, detective Malik is caught up in the aftermath of a car bomb which has killed two men, and heralded the arrival of NSO Agent Richard Skeritt (Gerald Lepkowski). The attack seemingly has links to a Muslim terrorist threat that they work to uncover. Meanwhile, Patricia Wright navigates her tumultuous relationship with her family, including her unpredictable brother, Craig (Gyton Grantley) and father, Mick (Richard Carter). Helen Callas, heavily pregnant, Sonny Koa and Jung Lim also return, investigating crimes that cross cultural boundaries in Sydney's multicultural inner west.

Season three
Following a deadly armored bank transport robbery by a highly organized team, Malik's wife Amina and son Amir are involved in a seemingly unrelated car accident. After Amir dies of an undetected aortic dissection, Malik takes the accident investigation personally.

Reception

Australian ratings

Awards

AACTA Awards

Australian Directors Guild Awards

Australian Writers Guild Awards

APRA-AGSC Screen Music Awards

Equity Awards

Logie Awards

References

External links
 
 Knox, David (27 November 2007). First Review: East West 101; TV Tonight.
 Knox, David (15 July 2009). Returning: East West 101. TV Tonight.
East West 101 at Australian Screen Online

Special Broadcasting Service original programming
2000s Australian drama television series
2000s Australian crime television series
2007 Australian television series debuts
2011 Australian television series endings
Television shows set in Sydney
2010s Australian drama television series
2010s Australian crime television series